Jim Wooten is an American journalist for ABC News and an author. He won the Robert F. Kennedy Book Award in 2005 for We Are All the Same.

References

External links

American television journalists
Living people
American male journalists
ABC News personalities
Year of birth missing (living people)